This is a list of Latin American and Caribbean countries by gross domestic product (nominal) in USD according to the International Monetary Fund's estimates in the October 2018 World Economic Outlook database.

Cuba is not included in the list due to lack of economic data. Puerto Rico is not listed since it is a U.S. territory, and neither is the Falkland Islands since it is a British Overseas Territory.

See also 

 Community of Latin American and Caribbean States
 List of Latin American and Caribbean countries by GDP (PPP)
 List of Latin American and Caribbean countries by GDP growth

References 

Latin American and Caribbean countries by GDP (nominal)
National accounts
GDP (nominal)
GDP (nomimal)
Latin America and the Caribbean